Willingham St Mary, also known simply as Willingham, is a village and civil parish in the English county of Suffolk located about  south of Beccles in the East Suffolk district. At the 2011 United Kingdom census it had a population of 152.

The A145 road cuts through the western section of the parish where it joins with Shadingfield. Sections of the Sotterley estate are included within its western section. A joint parish council covers the parishes of Ellough, Shadingfield, Sotterley and Willingham St Mary. As well as these parishes, Willingham also borders the parish of Weston.

The village has few services, with the largest population centre where it adjoins Shadingfield. Children attend primary school in Brampton and high school in Beccles. The Fox public house on the A145 is within the parish boundary, although more commonly associated with Shadingfield, and the two parishes share a village hall and playing field, both located on the parish border. The parish church, which was dedicated to St Mary, is no longer standing.

History

At the Domesday survey of 1086, the village of Willingaham formed part of the estates of Hugh de Montfort. It consisted of around 31 families, including at least 15 freemen, and paid 3 geld in taxation.

The village formed part of the estate of Elisabeth Bruisyard in 1281 and passed through various hands, including to the Playters of Sotterley, before becoming part of the estate of the Earl of Gosford who owned the manor in 1846. It consisted of around 1,000 acres and had a population of 156 in 1848; by 1872 Wilson's Imperial Gazetteer of England and Wales gives the population as 142 in 31 houses. The population has fluctuated slightly, although it has remained largely unchanged since the 1801 census.

There are four Grade II listed buildings in the parish. The late 18th century Fox Farmhouse, a late 17th to early 18th century timber framed barn at Moat Farm, a late 17th century timber framed barn at Willingham Hall and the late 16th to early 17th century Willingham Hall.

Willingham Hall is located near to the site of the parish church which is believed to have fallen into disrepair at the beginning of the 16th century, although two possible sites for the church are suggested on maps. The church, which was dedicated to St Mary and existed at the time of the Domesday survey, was recorded as "scarcely visible" by Suckling in 1846, although some remains could be seen in the 1920s. The parish was united with North Cove in 1526 and consolidated with Ellough following the reformation, the stone from the church probably being used to repair All Saints Church, Ellough and St Margarets Church, Sotterley. In 1873 it was united with the church at Sotterley.

The area around the hall and church are considered to be a possible site for a deserted medieval village. A number of ditches and pottery finds indicate buildings were located in this area and settlement is shown on a map from the late 18th century. Human bones have been observed in ploughsoil from one of the suspected sites for the church.

References

External links

Villages in Suffolk
Civil parishes in Suffolk
Waveney District